"Coach's Daughter" is the fifth episode of the American television sitcom Cheers, written by Ken Estin and directed by James Burrows. It first aired on NBC on October 28, 1982. This episode guest stars Allyce Beasley as Coach's daughter, Lisa Pantusso. In this episode, Lisa arrives with her fiancé Roy, who is boorish and obnoxious and rude to her, causing Coach to resent him.

When it first aired, this episode scored very low Nielsen ratings; however, network reruns of this episode improved. Although it did not earn award nominations, it has been praised as a favorite by critics and cast alike, including the late Nicholas Colasanto.

Plot 

Coach's (Nicholas Colasanto) daughter Lisa (Allyce Beasley), a district manager of her company, arrives with her fiancé Roy (Philip Charles MacKenzie), a door-to-door salesman who works for her company but turns out to be abrasive and insensitive. Repulsed by Roy's obnoxious, boorish personality and insults toward people, including Lisa, Coach finds Roy not good enough for her. However, Coach is too reluctant to tell her about Roy because she appears to like him and wants her father's blessings. To make matters worse, at Melville's restaurant, Roy forces her to pay for dinner herself, angering Coach.

Unable to keep his silence, Coach escorts Lisa into an office and openly refuses to let Lisa marry someone who treats her badly, like Roy. Lisa admits that she knows everything about Roy and that Roy wants to marry her merely for business reasons. Then Lisa reluctantly tells Coach that, despite all that, she wants to have a family of her own, that Roy is the first man in her life to propose to her but will be the last. Coach, shocked with disbelief, tells her that she's "beautiful", but Lisa objects and begs him for one moment to look at her and see what she really is. Coach then realizes and tells Lisa how much she resembles her mother, who Lisa said was not "comfortable about her [own] beauty." Coach tells Lisa that she is more beautiful every day, regardless of her appearance, just as her mother was more beautiful every day.

Lisa, feeling self-confident from her talk with Coach, tells Roy that she does not want to marry him because she finds him "more and more obnoxious." Roy vows that he will be "gone" as he exits the bar. Lisa prepares to celebrate her freedom from Roy with Coach, as they leave the bar. Meanwhile, Diane (Shelley Long) draws sketches of people, but her efforts show no resemblance to their subjects.

Production 
Ken Levine remarked that the whole audience laughed during the filming of an office scene between Coach and his daughter at the end of the episode. It was reshot but the audience still laughed. Glen and Les Charles decided to lift the laughter from the office scene, so it is not heard in the final cut. Before portraying Tim—a minor recurring character—in multiple episodes, Tim Cunningham portrays Chuck, who works at the lab that mutates viruses. Jacqueline Cassel and Teddy Bergeron are credited as a couple, to whom Diane shows her botched artwork.

Reception

Ratings
This episode first aired on NBC on October 28, 1982, at 9:00pm Eastern/Pacific (8:00pm Central/Mountain), competing against CBS's Simon & Simon and ABC's Too Close for Comfort, and landed on No. 66 out of 75 nationally broadcast prime time programs with an 11.0 Nielsen rating. In Alaska, it aired on November 11, 1982, at 8:00pm AKT.

This episode subsequently aired on NBC on March 10, 1983, at 9:30pm ET/PT (8:30pm CT/MT), competing against Simon & Simon and It Takes Two, and landed on No. 42 out of 72 nationally broadcast programs with the 14.8 rating. It aired again on NBC on July 7, 1983, at 9:30pm ET/PT (8:30pm CT/MT), competing against a rerun of Simon & Simon and ABC's two-hour television movie, The Last Ninja, and landed on No. 21 out of 66 nationally broadcast programs with a 12.9 rating and 23 share.

Critical reaction

Reviews have been positive. It is considered one of the favorites of cast and crew who were involved with this episode, including Allyce Beasley and especially the late Nicholas Colasanto. George Wendt and John Ratzenberger—who portrayed Norm and Cliff, respectively—considered it one of their personal favorites, mainly because of the office scene between Coach and his daughter. R.D. Heldenfels from The Sunday Gazette called the office scene "poignant." Robert Bianco of The Pittsburgh Press praised this episode as one of his favorites and called its office scene between Coach and his daughter "tender".

Many reviewers at The A.V. Club agreed that the scene between Coach and his daughter at the office is the most redeeming part of the episode, but they have mixed feelings about the rest of the episode. Ryan McGee found this episode too draggy and found Coach's daughter—Lisa—underdeveloped. Meredith Blake found this episode "underwhelming". Others praised this episode overall, including moments outside the story of Coach's daughter. Erik Adams observed that Coach can immediately sense a bad aspect about Roy, even when he is a "simpleton".

Aftermath 
Glen and Les Charles wanted this episode Emmy-nominated for Outstanding Writing for a Comedy Series, but Ken Estin, writer of this episode, declined.  (Estin was working simultaneously on Taxi, and as he was permitted only to submit one episode to the nominating committee for consideration, he submitted a Taxi script instead.)

Before appearing as a receptionist for a fictional detective agency in the television show, Moonlighting, Allyce Beasley had not found other roles for one year after this episode, according to Beasley herself.

In popular culture 
This episode is referenced in the novel American Gods by Neil Gaiman. In the novel, the main character is revealed to have watched this episode, particularly the office scene between Coach and his daughter. Later, gods contact him by controlling Carla, Cliff, and Diane via broadcast of this episode.

References 
From this episode

Los Angeles Times

Other sources

External links 
 
 "Coach's Daughter" at TV Guide

1982 American television episodes
Cheers episodes
Television episodes directed by James Burrows